Jagodići may refer to:

 Jagodići (Bugojno), a village in Bosnia and Herzegovina
 Jagodići (Goražde), a village in Bosnia and Herzegovina